Ball Mountain Dam (National ID # VT00001) is a dam in Jamaica, Windham County, Vermont, in the southeastern part of the state.

It impounds the West River of Vermont for flood control. The dam is owned and operated by the Army Corps of Engineers. The Corps identified safety and seepage problems with the dam in 2009, and has assigned it a Dam Safety Action Class rating of DSAC II, or "Urgent".

Recreation includes fishing (for stocked Atlantic salmon, smallmouth bass, and trout), camping at 111 campsites in nearby Winhall and Jamaica, and activities at the adjacent Jamaica State Park. The river between Ball Mountain Lake and downstream Townshend Lake (also operated by the Army Corps of Engineers) is used for white water boating during releases from the Ball Mountain Dam, usually occurring during one weekend in April and one weekend in September.

References 

Dams in Vermont
Buildings and structures in Jamaica, Vermont
Reservoirs in Vermont
United States Army Corps of Engineers dams
Dams completed in 1961
Bodies of water of Windham County, Vermont
1961 establishments in Vermont